Days are Numbered is a 1962 Italian film directed by Elio Petri.

It was awarded best film at the Mar del Plata Film Festival. It also won the Silver Ribbon for Best Original Story.

Cast 
Salvo Randone as Cesare
Franco Sportelli as Amilcare
Regina Bianchi as Giulia
Lando Buzzanca as the child
Paolo Ferrari as Vinicio
Vittorio Caprioli as mercante d'arte
Giulio Battiferri as Spartaco

Release
Days are Numbered was released on March 25, 1962 at the Mar del Plata International Film Festival.

References

Sources

External links

1962 films
Italian drama films
1962 drama films
Films directed by Elio Petri
Films with screenplays by Tonino Guerra
Films set in Rome
Titanus films
1960s Italian films